Tomáš Pék (born May 30, 1991) is a Slovak professional ice hockey goaltender who played with HC Slovan Bratislava in the Slovak Extraliga during the 2010–11 season. He was selected by SKA St. Petersburg in the first round (10th overall) of the 2010 KHL Junior Draft.

External links
Profile at HokejPortal.cz Tomáš Pék

Living people
HC Slovan Bratislava players
Slovak ice hockey goaltenders
1991 births
Ice hockey people from Bratislava
Slovak expatriate ice hockey people
Slovak expatriate sportspeople in the Netherlands
Slovak expatriate sportspeople in Belgium
Slovak expatriate sportspeople in France
HYS The Hague players
Expatriate ice hockey players in the Netherlands
Expatriate ice hockey players in Belgium
Expatriate ice hockey players in France
Bisons de Neuilly-sur-Marne players